The 29th Dáil was elected at the 2002 general election on 17 May 2002 and met on 6 June 2002. The members of Dáil Éireann, the house of representatives of the Oireachtas (legislature) of Ireland, are known as TDs. The 29th Dáil was dissolved by President Mary McAleese on 26 April 2007, at the request of the Taoiseach Bertie Ahern. The 29th Dáil lasted  days, the 3rd longest after the 10th Dáil and the 28th Dáil.

Composition of the 29th Dáil

Fianna Fáil and the Progressive Democrats, denoted with bullets, formed the 26th Government of Ireland.

Graphical representation
This is a graphical comparison of party strengths in the 29th Dáil from June 2002. This was not the official seating plan.

Ceann Comhairle
On 6 June 2002, Rory O'Hanlon (FF) was proposed by Bertie Ahern for the position of Ceann Comhairle. O'Hanlon was approved without a vote.

List of TDs
This is a list of the 166 TDs elected to Dáil Éireann in the 2002 general election, sorted by party. The Changes table below records all changes in party affiliation during the 29th Dáil.

Changes

See also
Members of the 22nd Seanad

References

Further reading

External links
Houses of the Oireachtas: Debates: 29th Dáil

 
29th Dáil
29